Richard Harford  was a  Welsh Anglican priest in the 16th century.

Harford was educated at Merton College, Oxford. He held livings at Canon Frome, Bromsgrove, Richard's Castle and Woolhope. Harford was  Archdeacon of St Davids from 1757 to 1751.

References

Alumni of Merton College, Oxford
Archdeacons of St Davids
16th-century Welsh Anglican priests